Rimazolium is a non-narcotic analgesic.  It is usually formulated as the mesylate salt, rimazolium metilsufate.

References 

Analgesics
Quaternary ammonium compounds
Ethyl esters